The Ottawa Lynx were a Minor League Baseball team that competed in the Triple-A International League (IL) from 1993 to 2007. The team's home field was Lynx Stadium in Ottawa, Ontario. Over 15 seasons, the team was an affiliate of the Montreal Expos (1993–2002), Baltimore Orioles (2003–2006), and Philadelphia Phillies (2007). At the time, it was the only IL franchise in Canada.

In late August 2006, the league approved the conditions to negotiate the sale of the team. The new owners moved the team to Allentown, Pennsylvania, beginning with the 2008 season, where it became known as the Lehigh Valley IronPigs.

History 

In 1991, Ottawa businessman and then Ottawa 67's owner Howard Darwin was successful in applying to the IL for an expansion franchise to begin play in 1993, at a cost of $5 million. The Lynx became the second IL franchise to play in Ottawa, after the former Ottawa Giants and Ottawa Athletics of the 1950s. The application was contingent on the City of Ottawa building a baseball stadium for the team. Lynx Stadium was completed in time for the 1993 season.

The Lynx began play in 1993, serving as the top farm team for the Montreal Expos. The team won the International League championship in 1995, the only time it would do so. During this period, the Lynx featured such future Major League Baseball players as Rondell White, Cliff Floyd, Matt Stairs, Kirk Rueter, and F.P. Santangelo. The Lynx eventually retired two numbers: Santangelo's 24, and Jamey Carroll's 3.

In 2000, Darwin sold his shares in the team to Ray Pecor for $7 million. According to news reports, Pecor lost $1 million annually on the team due to low attendance.

In 2003, the Lynx were not given any assurances from either the Montreal Expos or Major League Baseball on the long-term future of the Expos. They became the Triple-A affiliate of the Baltimore Orioles on September 24, 2002. As a result, Montreal shifted its affiliation to the Edmonton Trappers of the Pacific Coast League. The Lynx's working agreement with the Orioles ended when the latter signed a Player Development Contract with the Norfolk Tides on September 25, 2006.

In 2006, the ball club was sold to Joe Finley and Craig Stein, while Pecor maintained a minority stake. Finley and Stein declared their intention to move the team to Allentown, Pennsylvania, for the 2008 season, where a new stadium was set to begin construction that September (now built as Coca-Cola Park). The owners, facing a lawsuit from the City of Ottawa if they moved the Lynx, filed a lawsuit of their own against the City of Ottawa on October 17, 2006, seeking $10.75 million in damages claiming that the city failed to provide enough parking spaces, which, the team alleged, was a violation of its lease. The location far from the city centre might have contributed to the attendance problem.

The team played its last game in Ottawa on September 3, 2007, in front of a crowd of 7,461 people, losing to the Syracuse Chiefs, 8–5. The Ottawa Lynx ultimately won exactly 1,000 games before leaving Ottawa.

Titles 
The Lynx won the Governors' Cup, the championship of the International League, once by defeating the Norfolk Tides in 1995.

Season-by-season records

Alumni 
 Matt Stairs (1993) – Outfielder/designated hitter/first baseman for Montreal, Boston, Oakland, Chicago Cubs, Milwaukee, Pittsburgh, Kansas City, Detroit, Texas, Toronto, Philadelphia, San Diego Padres, and Washington Nationals
 Rondell White (1993–94) – Outfielder/designated hitter for Montreal, Chicago Cubs, New York Yankees, San Diego, Kansas City, Detroit, and Minnesota
 Kirk Rueter (1993–1996) – Pitcher for Montreal and San Francisco
 Cliff Floyd (1993; 1996) – First baseman/outfielder/designated hitter for Montreal, Florida, Boston, New York Mets, Chicago Cubs, and Tampa Bay Rays
 F.P. Santangelo (1993–95; 1998) – Outfielder/second baseman for Montreal, San Francisco, Los Angeles Dodgers, and Oakland
 Curtis Pride (1993–95; 2001) – Outfielder/designated hitter for Montreal, Detroit, Boston, Atlanta, New York Yankees, and Anaheim/Los Angeles Angels of Anaheim
 Ugueth Urbina (1995–96) – Pitcher for Montreal, Boston, Texas, Florida, Detroit, and Philadelphia
 José Vidro (1997–98) – Second baseman/third baseman/designated hitter for Montreal/Washington and Seattle
 Orlando Cabrera (1997–98; 2000) – Gold Glove shortstop for Montreal, Boston Red Sox, Los Angeles Angels of Anaheim, Chicago White Sox, Oakland Athletics, Minnesota Twins, Cincinnati Reds, Cleveland Indians, and San Francisco Giants
 Javier Vázquez (1999) – Pitcher for Montreal, New York Yankees, Arizona, and Chicago White Sox
 Michael Barrett (2000) – Catcher for Montreal, Chicago Cubs, and San Diego
 Jamey Carroll (2000–02) – Third baseman/shortstop/second baseman for Montreal/Washington, Cleveland Indians, and Colorado
 Brandon Phillips (2002) – 2-time Gold Glove winner at second base for Cincinnati
 Rick Bauer (2003–05; 2007) – Pitcher for Baltimore and Texas
 Eli Whiteside (2005–06) – Catcher for Baltimore and San Francisco
 Adam Loewen (2006) – Baltimore Orioles pitcher and outfielder, Toronto outfielder
 Hayden Penn (2006) – Pitcher for Baltimore and Florida
 Chris Coste (2007) – Houston Astros catcher
 Zack Segovia (2007) – Philadelphia Phillies pitcher
 J. D. Durbin (2007) – Philadelphia Phillies pitcher
 Clay Condrey (2007) – Philadelphia Phillies pitcher
 Mike Zagurski (2007) – Philadelphia Phillies pitcher
 Yoel Hernández (2007) – Philadelphia Phillies pitcher
 Brian Sanches (2007) – Philadelphia Phillies pitcher
 Kane Davis (2007) – Philadelphia Phillies pitcher
 Chris Roberson (2007) – Philadelphia Phillies outfielder
 Fabio Castro (2007) – Philadelphia Phillies pitcher
 Geoff Geary (2007) – Pitcher for Philadelphia and Houston
 John Ennis (2007) – Philadelphia Phillies pitcher
 J. A. Happ (2007) – Pitcher for the Philadelphia Phillies, New York Yankees, Toronto Blue Jays, and Minnesota Twins.

See also 
 Ottawa Rapidz, an independent baseball team active in 2008
 Ottawa Fat Cats, a semi-professional baseball team active from 2010 to 2012
 Ottawa Champions, an independent baseball team active from 2015 to 2019

References

External links 

 Ottawa Lynx Former official website (Internet Archive).

 
Baseball teams established in 1993
Sports clubs disestablished in 2007
Defunct International League teams
Lyn
Montreal Expos minor league affiliates
Baltimore Orioles minor league affiliates
Philadelphia Phillies minor league affiliates
Defunct baseball teams in Canada
Baseball teams in Ontario
1993 establishments in Ontario
2007 disestablishments in Ontario